Toni Catany (1942-2013) was a Catalan photographer. Catany was born in Llucmajor.

His work is included in collections of the Museum of Fine Arts Houston, 
the Museo Reina Sofia, Madrid, and the Museu Nacional d'Art de Catalunya.

References

1942 births
2013 deaths
20th-century Spanish artists
20th-century photographers
21st-century Spanish artists
21st-century photographers